Team Bury Football Club was a football club based in Bury St Edmunds, Suffolk. Consisting of players largely drawn from the West Suffolk College Football Academy, they were a feeder club and reserve team for Bury Town.

History
The club was established in 2005 under the name West Suffolk College F.C. as the team was formed by students at the West Suffolk College Sports Academy. They joined Division Two of the Essex and Suffolk Border League and finished as Division Two runners-up in their first season, earning promotion to Division One. The club went on to win the Division One title in 2006–07 and were promoted to the Premier Division, after which they were renamed Team Bury following a move to Bury Town's Ram Meadow ground. In 2008–09 the club finished second in the Premier Division, and were accepted into Division One of the Eastern Counties League. In 2009–10 the club won the Suffolk Senior Cup, beating Capel Plough 2–0 in the final.

Team Bury finished bottom of Division One in 2017–18, and folded in July 2018.

Ground
In 2007 the club relocated from the Gainsborough Sports Centre in Ipswich and began playing at Bury Town's Ram Meadow ground.

Honours
Essex & Suffolk Border League
Division One champions 2006–07
Suffolk Senior Cup
Winners 2010

Records
Best FA Cup performance: Preliminary round, 2010–11
Best FA Vase performance: Second round, 2011–12

References

External links
 

Defunct football clubs in England
Defunct football clubs in Suffolk
Association football clubs established in 2005
2005 establishments in England
Association football clubs disestablished in 2018
2018 disestablishments in England
Bury Town F.C.
Essex and Suffolk Border Football League
Eastern Counties Football League
University and college football clubs in England